{{Infobox football biography
| name           = Flórián Urbán
| image          =
| fullname       = Flórián Urbán
| birth_date     = 
| birth_place    = Budapest, Hungary
| height         = 
| currentclub    = Lombard-Pápa TFC
| clubnumber     = Manager
| position       = Centre Back/Defensive Midfielder
| youthyears1    = |  youthclubs1 = Duna Cipő
| youthyears2    = –1990 | youthclubs2 = Újpesti Dózsa
| years1         = 1990–1991 | clubs1 = Volán | caps1 = 27 | goals1 = 2
| years2         = 1991–1992 | clubs2 = Győri ETO | caps2 = 26 | goals2 = 6
| years3         = 1992–1993 | clubs3 = Waregem | caps3 = 42 | goals3 = 9
| years4         = 1994–1995 | clubs4 = Mechelen | caps4 = 39 | goals4 = 14
| years5         = 1995 | clubs5 = Újpest | caps5 = 9 | goals5 = 0
| years6         = 1996 | clubs6 = Waregem | caps6 = 13 | goals6 = 4
| years7         = 1996 | clubs7 = Győri ETO | caps7 = 14 | goals7 = 6
| years8         = 1997 | clubs8 = Germinal Ekeren | caps8 = 28 | goals8 = 1
| years9         = 1997 | clubs9 = Anderlecht | caps9 = 2 | goals9 = 0
| years10        = 1998–1999 | clubs10 = Eendracht Aalst | caps10 = 30 | goals10 = 3
| years11        = 1999 | clubs11 = Újpest | caps11 = 15 | goals11 = 2
| years12        = 2000 | clubs12 = Spartak Subotica | caps12 = 2 | goals12 = 0
| years13        = 2000 | clubs13 = Szegedi LC | caps13 = 11 | goals13 = 0
| years14        = 2000 | clubs14 = Dunakeszi VSE | caps14 = 10 | goals14 = 2
| years15        = 2000–2001 | clubs15 = Újpest | caps15 = 34 | goals15 = 15
| years16        = 2001–2003 | clubs16 = Zalaegerszegi | caps16 = 56 | goals16 = 4
| years17        = 2003–2004 | clubs17 = Újpest | caps17 = 4 | goals17 = 0
| clubs18        = Career Total | caps18 = 360 | goals18 = 68
| nationalyears1 = 1991–2003 | nationalteam1 = Hungary
| nationalcaps1  = 40 | nationalgoals1 = 4
| manageryears1  = 2004–2006 | managerclubs1 = REAC
| manageryears2  = 2007 | managerclubs2 = FC Felcsút
| manageryears3  = 2008 | managerclubs3 = Lombard-Pápa TFC
| manageryears4  = 2012 | managerclubs4 = Vasas SC
}}Flórián Urbán (born 29 July 1968) is a Hungarian football manager and former player. He played primarily as a centre back.

Career
He represented several Hungarian clubs during his career, such as Volán FC, Győri ETO FC, Újpest FC, Szegedi LC, Dunakeszi VSE and Zalaegerszegi TE. During the 1990s he spent most of his career in Belgium playing with K.S.V. Waregem, Mechelen, Germinal Ekeren, RSC Anderlecht and Eendracht Aalst. In 1999, he had a spell with FK Spartak Subotica in the First League of FR Yugoslavia. He played mostly as defensive midfielder, sweeper or central defender.

National team
Urban made his debut for the Hungarian national team in 1991, and got 40 caps and 4 goals until 2003.

International goals

Coaching career
After retiring Urbán begin his coaching career in 2004. He has been the manager of REAC, FC Felcsút, Lombard-Pápa TFC and Vasas SC. In 2007, he participated in the reality show Lúzer FC, in which he was the coach of the titular team, consisting of people who very much can't play football.

 Honours Germinal Ekeren Belgian Cup: 1996–97Zalaegerszeg'''
Nemzeti Bajnokság I: 2001–02

References

External sources
 Stats from Hungarian Championship at Futball-Adattár

1968 births
Living people
Hungarian footballers
Hungary international footballers
Hungarian expatriate footballers
Association football defenders
Association football midfielders
Volán FC players
Győri ETO FC players
Újpest FC players
Szeged LC footballers
Zalaegerszegi TE players
K.S.V. Waregem players
K.V. Mechelen players
Beerschot A.C. players
R.S.C. Anderlecht players
S.C. Eendracht Aalst players
Belgian Pro League players
Expatriate footballers in Belgium
FK Spartak Subotica players
Expatriate footballers in Serbia and Montenegro
Hungarian expatriate sportspeople in Serbia and Montenegro
Footballers from Budapest